The International Rescue Committee (IRC) bestows its Freedom Award for extraordinary contributions to the cause of refugees and human freedom. According to the IRC, "The Freedom Award reveals the remarkable ability of an individual to shape history and change for the better a world moving toward freedom for all."

The IRC was founded in 1933 at the request of Albert Einstein, and made its first Freedom Award in 1957, to German politician Willy Brandt, who went on to win the Nobel Peace Prize.  The following year, the award was presented to Winston Churchill, British prime minister during the Second World War, for his "dedicated and devoted service to the cause of human liberty".  The first joint recipients of the award were Lane Kirkland and his wife Irena who won the prize in 1981.  Lane was honored for his "long devotion to the cause of refugees" while Irena was described as "very much a human rights activist".  Chinese dissidents Li Shuxian and Fang Lizhi were jointly honored in 1991; two American Presidents,  George H. W. Bush and Bill Clinton took the prize as a pair in 2005, and film actress Angelina Jolie and United Nations High Commissioner for Refugees High Commissioner António Guterres received the award together in 2007.

Since the first award presentation in 1957, the IRC has made it to 46 recipients, 24 of which were American; the majority of awards have been to politicians.  The 1995 presentation was made in absentia to Burmese pro-democracy campaigner and leader of the opposition National League for Democracy (NLD) party, Aung San Suu Kyi.  The 2011 award ceremony was held in New York City, at the Waldorf-Astoria Hotel in November, where the presentation was made to the Brokaw family.  In 2012, John C. Whitehead received the prize for a second time, the only person to do so.

Recipients

Notes

A ^ Lord's award was made posthumously.
B ^ Distinguished Humanitarian Award
C ^ Distinguished Public Service Award
D ^ Special Freedom Award Recipient, in absentia

References 

Human rights awards
Humanitarian and service awards
Awards established in 1957